Jessica Andrews is a fictional character portrayed by Robyn Lively in the film The Karate Kid Part III (1989), and in the fifth season of its sequel series Cobra Kai (2022).

Overview
In 1985, Jessica Andrews, who is originally from Columbus, Ohio, worked in her Aunt Pat's pottery shop in Los Angeles (while living in an apartment above the shop). After two months, she meets Daniel LaRusso (as Mr. Miyagi's Bonsai shop was across the street), and as she had recently broken up with her boyfriend, they planned to go out on a date. Later on the same day, she made up with her boyfriend, and she and Daniel decided to just be friends.

After a number of adventures with Daniel (that involved Terry Silver and Mike Barnes), Jessica returned to Columbus, and remained in contact with Daniel. Sometime prior to 2002, she introduced Daniel to her cousin Amanda Steiner, who was moving out to Los Angeles, and would eventually marry him. Jessica currently lives in Columbus, and enjoys rock climbing with her daughters.

Young Jessica Andrews

In 1985, Daniel LaRusso visits a pottery shop after Mr. Miyagi sends him there. He meets a young woman working on a pottery wheel, and explains to her that he has just opened a Bonsai tree shop across the street with his partner, and is in need of pots. Daniel then learns that her name is Jessica Andrews, and after seeing a picture of her rock - climbing with a man whose face is missing from the photo, also discovers that she has recently broken up with her boyfriend (as he had started dating their high school classmate, Elizabeth Anne Rooney, whom she later describes to Daniel as "The traitor). As Daniel is leaving after ordering the pots, they decide to go on a date that evening (and Daniel also discovers when he returns to the Bonsai store that Mr. Miyagi intentionally sent him to meet Jessica).

That evening when Daniel comes to pick up Jessica, he learns that she and her boyfriend had gotten back together, and that she is going to return to Columbus home after Thanksgiving. They decided to "go Dutch" instead and to be friends. He also introduces Jessica to Mr. Miyagi, who is leaving the shop as they enter. They then get into a conversation about Karate, which is then interrupted as Mike Barnes and Snake barge into the shop. They harass and attempt to intimidate Daniel into signing the application for the All-Valley (which Daniel had declined to enter). When Barnes comes on to Jessica, she calls him a "slime-ball" and appears ready to fight him as well (stopped by Daniel).
 
The next evening, Jessica visits the Bonsai shop with Mac and cheese, which turns out to be one of Daniel's favorite foods. She also gives him the pot he had ordered, and he reciprocates with tickets to a dance club for the night before she leaves as a going away present. They are then interrupted by Mike Barnes, Snake, and Dennis, who begin to attack the shop when they discover that Daniel has still not signed the form. When Daniel goes to confront Dennis, Jessica attempts to intervene, but is pushed away from the fight by Barnes, telling her to "stay there". When Snake rushes to help Dennis, Jessica punches him in the stomach, but is then kicked away by Barnes, who begins to fight with Daniel. Eventually Mr. Miyagi appears and ends the fight. When Daniel asks how Jessica is, she appears relatively ok, but wants to take a rest. 

Later, Daniel and Mr. Miyagi realize that all of their Bonsai trees have been stolen. Resolved to replace them, Daniel decides to climb down the mountain where Mr. Miyagi has planted a valuable Bonsai tree that Mr. Miyagi brought from Okinawa and retrieve it (in order to sell it). He tells Jessica her what happened, and how the police did not take it seriously, so he had no choice but to get this tree. An experienced rock climber, Jessica works with him to retrieve the tree, though she has reservations about the fact that he did not tell Mr. Miyagi. Daniel, however, is convinced it is the only way to save the business. Using a set of binoculars, Daniel locates the position of the tree, and Jessica teaches him how to climb down the mountain. In the process of dislodging the tree, it falls to the water below and they both hurry to retrieve it (despite the fact that the tide is coming in). As they are putting the tree into a bag, they see Mike Barnes, Snake, and Dennis pulling the ropes back up the mountain. Trapped by the situation, Daniel has no choice but to sign the application, in exchange for the ropes being let back down. Ultimately, Barnes, Snake, and Dennis pull them both up the mountain, although in the process Barnes breaks tree into two.

The next day, Daniel and Jessica go for a run in the park, where Daniel tells her that Mr. Miyagi is still refusing to train him. She is also serving as his coach, telling him not to stop as he pauses for a drink of water.  Terry Silver appears near the water fountain in an old car, and re-introduces himself to Daniel (who had met him the day before). Daniel then introduces Silver to Jessica. Silver is friendly to Daniel, appearing to offer helpful advice and a book. As he is leaving, he says: "Nice to meet you Jessica Andrews. Take care of our champion". Jessica then tells Daniel: "That was a nice offer about the book". She then pulls him back into their workout, telling him that he's got "to get some muscle".

After Silver drops by Mr. Miyagi dojo to give Daniel the book (and seemingly protect him from Mike Barnes), Daniel returns to the Bonsai shop and is greeted by Mr. Miyagi and Jessica (who has made a few more pots for them, which she had stayed up all night to make). Following up on what seemed like a karate suggestion from Silver (which he assures Daniel is the key to success in a tournament), he asks Mr. Miyagi, "Do you know how to Sweep?" Mr. Miyagi returns with a broom and Jessica laughs. Infuriated, Daniel, drives off in a rage, as Jessica and Mr. Miyagi watch, and goes to join Cobra Kai in order to work with Silver.
 
On her last night in town, Jessica and Daniel go dancing at the club he told her about earlier. As they enter the club, Daniel excitedly tells her about Silver, his new teacher, the guy she met when they were jogging. When he praises Silver, Jessica reminds him that he had said the same thing about Mr. Miyagi. As they are dancing, Silver appears (though hidden by a beam), and finds a random man in the room whom he bribes to hit on Jessica. 

Silver greets Daniel who is surprised to see him, although Silver reminds Daniel that he told him about the plans to go to the club. In what seems to be a coincidence, the random man appears and grabs Jessica by the arm saying, "hold up, sexy lady...I've been watching you and you are hot". As Terry watches, Daniel immediately jumps to her defense saying that Jessica is with him. When the man asks, "says who?" Jessica furiously states, "says me, come on" and grabs Daniel to leave. The man, however, grabs Daniel saying he is taking Jessica home, to which Daniel responds by punching him in the nose. Jessica is horrified by this response, saying to Daniel: "What are you doing? What is wrong with you? What are you nuts?" as she storms off. Daniel is then pulled away by Terry Silver, who tells him repeatedly that he did the right thing.

Filled with remorse, Daniel goes to Jessica's apartment (where she is packing to go home). Although still angry, she lets him in. He apologizes for his behavior, and tells her he plans to apologize to the man. He also tells her that he "didn't want you leaving thinking that was me". When she asked who it was then, Daniel replies that he has "been trying to be someone I'm not and it's not working. I feel like I'm losing control of everything". He tells her that he feels as if he has lost control of everything and doesn't know what to do.

As Jessica begins to understand that Silver has been manipulating him, she sits next to him and says that just because she is angry doesn't mean that they aren't still friends. She also reassures him that Mr. Miyagi told her how much Daniel means to him, and that he has faith in Daniel. She also convinces him to go to Mr. Miyagi and tell him the truth. As Daniel is leaving, he tells Jessica he will miss her, to which she says: "Send me a Christmas Card, ok?" He replies, "you got a deal".

Adult Jessica Andrews

Season 5, Episode 5

In 2019, after having a falling out with Daniel over her inability to understand that Daniel is telling her the truth and that Terry Silver is a psychopath, Amanda takes Sam and Anthony to visit her mother Joanne in Ohio for a while. One evening, while playing cards with her mother, Jessica arrives. She then learns from Sam that Daniel didn't join them on this visit, much to her disappointment. 

They go to a bar from their childhood, where Jessica and Amanda catch up. Jessica tells Amanda that she has just finished rock climbing in the Gorge with her daughters. She however doesn't want to talk about herself but wants to understand why Daniel is absent. At that moment, a woman from another table, Elizabeth Anne Rooney begins to harass Jessica and Amanda, until they politely get them to back off. 

Amanda then tells Jessica that her problems with Daniel revolve around karate, and enemies from Daniel's past who continue to harass him. When she mentions that the latest one is Silver, Jessica is horrified about it. Amanda is shocked and wonders how Jessica knows who Silver is. Jessica responds that when she first met Daniel, he was going through some things and Silver was the cause behind it. Amanda is surprised that she didn't tell her about all of this before. Jessica responds that she "never thought that he would come back around".

She then tells Amanda about their experiences with Silver back in 1985, stating that he pretended to be Daniel's friend and then his mentor while having Barnes, Snake and Dennis harass him, Jessica, and Mr. Miyagi. She said that the goal was to drive a wedge between Daniel and Mr. Miyagi, which succeeded for some time. Ashamed, Amanda realizes Daniel was telling her the truth.

Lizzie-Anne later bullies and gets into a physical fight with the two women, but Sam ultimately ends the fight and they leave the bar.

Back at her mother's house, Jessica admires Sam's karate skills, as well as her protective instincts (traits which, according to Jessica, come from both Daniel and Amanda). She then jokes that they got into a bar fight over nothing, but that Daniel has every reason to hate Silver as he had made his life worse, even admitting she herself still has nightmares from the events. Jessica then advises Amanda to cut her husband some slack, leading Amanda to return home to help Daniel.

Commentary
Lively learned of her involvement with Cobra Kai when she received a phone call from the creators. The decision to make Jessica and Amanda cousins developed due to a trend that the creators have observed: "One thing that we've noticed in the Cobra Kai fandom is everyone's always saying so-and-so is related to so-and-so...and more often than not we find that kind of thing cheesy. It wouldn't feel grounded". However, Hurwitz notes that the return of Terry Silver offered a perfect opportunity to make this kind of connection: "It gets to the point where Terry has sort of driven [Daniel] crazy enough to make him look like a crazy person in front of Amanda.... "Amanda is just like, 'I need a break from this' and leaves town. And we thought, 'What better character to give Amanda some perspective on what Daniel actually went through back in the day than the woman who was there with Daniel?'" Robyn Lively concurred, citing the choice as "a full circle moment and so satisfying". Hurwitz also references Jessica's critical role as matchmaker: "[Amanda] moved out to LA and didn't know anybody. And Jessica's like, 'Hey, there's this nice guy that I know...she's just like, 'Hey, I'm gonna introduce Amanda, my cousin, Amanda, to this really nice guy'. And the rest is history... She has this great energy about her that is very similar to Courtney Henggeler's energy. So to bring those two actresses together, it felt like they were sisters, it felt like they were cousins. It just felt right".

Lively also enjoyed reuniting with her co-stars, stating that there was "ton of screaming and dancing and lots of just joy...I hadn't seen Ralph since I was in my early twenties. And Billy — we've been friends for more years than I can count. It was just an absolute epic reunion". Although she has always viewed her early work on The Karate Kid III as "an absolute career highlight", she acknowledges the "frustration" on the set as they "didn't have a complete script. There were a lot of changes coming at us daily, and those are difficult circumstances to work under". However, she liked working with Ralph Macchio whom she describes as "professional and kind and warm and lovely to work with". She also notes that although her character was originally written as "a love interest", the relationship was eventually rewritten as a platonic one, which Lively suspects was due to the significant difference in their ages. She also recalls that Pat Morita was "funny, charming and delightful. I went to junior high with his daughter, which I didn't even realize until he was like, "You go to school with my daughter". [Laughs] I didn't have a lot of screen time with him or spend much time with him, but the little time that I did get to spend was absolutely wonderful".

References

External links
Karate Kid III: Refusing to Compete Scene
Karate Kid III: Save the Tree! Scene
Karate Kid III: Blackmailed Scene
Karate Kid III: Killer Instinct Scene
Cobra Kai, Season 5: Jessica Andrews returns and still kicks ass? yeah. not surprised

Film characters introduced in 1989
Female characters in film
Teenage characters in film
The Karate Kid (franchise) characters